This is a list of airlines currently operating in Mayotte.

See also
 List of airlines
 List of defunct airlines of Africa

Mayotte-related lists
Mayote
MAyotte
 

Lists of organizations based in Mayotte